No Ordinary Man is a Canadian documentary film, directed by Aisling Chin-Yee and Chase Joynt, and written by Aisling Chin-Yee and Amos Mac. It is a portrait of Billy Tipton, the jazz musician who was revealed after his death to have been transgender.

The film's production was affected by the COVID-19 pandemic in Canada. However, as principal photography was already completed, it mainly affected tasks such as editing and post-production work that could be done remotely.

The film premiered at the 2020 Toronto International Film Festival. It was subsequently screened at the 2020 Inside Out Film and Video Festival, where it won the award for Best Canadian Film.

Oscilloscope Laboratories has acquired U.S. rights to No Ordinary Man.

Critical response
For Now and The Georgia Straight, Kevin Ritchie praised the film, writing that its "overlapping realizations create a complex portrait while making No Ordinary Man as much about the present as it is about the past. [It] ultimately builds to a moving and surprising climax in which the empathetic trans views of Tipton are finally able to eclipse the parochial tabloid tale."

The film was named to TIFF's year-end Canada's Top Ten list for feature films. It was subsequently named as a Prix Iris nominee for the Public Prize at the 23rd Quebec Cinema Awards.

In The New Yorker, Richard Brody writes: "In No Ordinary Man, the directors Aisling Chin-Yee and Chase Joynt go fascinatingly, probingly further, to question the very prospect of making a biographical film about their subject, the trans jazz musician Billy Tipton. No Ordinary Man, in that sense, is a genre unto itself, a meta-biographical film about a musician who earned his place in history posthumously, for reasons that he carefully avoided revealing throughout his life."

Accolades

References

External links

2020 films
2020 documentary films
2020 LGBT-related films
Canadian documentary films
Canadian LGBT-related films
Documentary films about jazz music and musicians
Transgender-related documentary films
Films about trans men
2020s English-language films
2020s Canadian films